Eriko Yamada (born 13 June 1973) is a Japanese luger. She competed in the women's singles event at the 1998 Winter Olympics.

References

1973 births
Living people
Japanese female lugers
Olympic lugers of Japan
Lugers at the 1998 Winter Olympics
People from Nagano (city)